Road to Sunday was an American football video game developed by San Diego Studio and published by Sony Computer Entertainment for the PlayStation 2 and the PlayStation Portable. As of July 20, 2005, Road to Sunday has been cancelled.

History 
It is the successor to NFL GameDay which could no longer use NFL Teams or Players because EA Sports acquiring the  exclusive rights to the NFL for the subsequent five years for Madden NFL.

Plot
Road to Sunday revolves around Blake Doogan, who inherits a pro football team after his father is killed in a suspicious explosion while in Jamaica. Later, Blake learns that his father borrowed large sums of money from a Jamaican kingpin to purchase the professional football team the Los Angeles Show, and Doogan's father's debt is now his debt.

Gameplay
The gameplay follows the Blake, his friend/sidekick Harry and seven football players as they put it all on the line in order to get enough money to pay off the kingpin and win the championship. The on-the-field football experience is best characterized as mission-based football, done through the introduction of a new gameplay experience, Position Specific Gameplay (PSG). Players not only compete on the gridiron, but also gain exposure to an underworld of questionable characters, gambling, and an underground fighting league ran by the corrupt Jamaican kingpin. These off-field exploitations will drive the storyline as well as increase players’ abilities to perform in future missions and impact the outcome of future football games.

References

Cancelled PlayStation 2 games
Cancelled PlayStation Portable games
American football video games
San Diego Studio games